Extended BIOS may refer to:

 XIOS, the extended BIOS in Digital Research's MP/M, Concurrent CP/M, Concurrent DOS, Multiuser DOS and REAL/32 (since 1979)
 XBIOS, the extended BIOS in Atari TOS-based computers (since 1984/1985)

 EX-BIOS, non-standard BIOS extensions in the HP Vectra series of computers (since 1985)

See also
 BIOS extension
 Enhanced BIOS (LBA)
 VESA BIOS Extensions (VBE)